Rodger is a surname, and is a variant of Roger as a first name.

First name
 Rodger Arneil, Scottish rugby union player
 Rodger Bain, British former record producer
 Rodger Bumpass, American voice actor and actor
Rodger Corser, Australian actor
 Rodger Dean Duncan, American author and business consultant
 Rodger McFarlane, American gay rights activist
 Rodger O. Riney, American CEO, president and founder of Scottrade Inc.
Rodger Saffold, American football player (NFL)
 Rodger Smith, Canadian ice hockey player
 Rodger Wilton Young (1918–1943), American U.S. Army soldier during World War II, recipient of the Medal of Honor

Surname
 Alan Rodger, Baron Rodger of Earlsferry (born 1944), Scottish judge
 George Rodger (1908–1995), British photojournalist
 Peter Rodger, British-American filmmaker, son of George
 Elliot Rodger (1991–2014), grandson of George, British-born American spree killer
 Jim Rodger (born 1933), Scottish footballer
 N. A. M. Rodger, British naval historian
 Patrick Campbell Rodger (1920–2002), British Anglican ecumenist
 Tom Rodger, Scottish footballer

See also
 All pages beginning with Rodger
 Rodgers, a surname and given name
 Roger, a surname and given name

English masculine given names